Ogof Nadolig is a cave in the Alyn Gorge near Cilcain, Flintshire, Wales.

Nearby, but closer to the river, are the caves Ogof Hesp Alyn and Ogof Hen Ffynhonnau.

Its name derives from the fact that it was discovered on Christmas Day.

References

External links
 Tourist write-up of caving
 cowdery's cave guide to nadilog

Nadilog
Landforms of Flintshire